Aadu Magaadra Bujji is a 2013 Indian Telugu-language romantic action comedy film directed by debutante director Krishna Reddy Gangadhasuu and starring Sudheer Babu, Asmita Sood and Poonam Kaur in the lead roles. The film is jointly produced by M Subbareddy and S N Reddy under SNR Films India Pvt Ltd and Colours & Claps Entertainments banner. Music is composed by Sri Kommineni.

Plot
Siddhu (Sudheer), a naughty easy-going guy, falls in love with Indu (Asmita Sood). But Indu is the sister of Cherry (Ranadheer), who keeps on protecting his sister from others’ eyes. But on the other hand, Cherry loves Anjali (Poonam Kaur), the sister-in-law of a dangerous man Bujji aka Shankar (Ajay). How things move among these people, how Siddhu plays with Shankar forms the main story.

Cast
 Sudheer Babu as Siddhu
 Asmita Sood as Indu
 Ajay as Shankar Anna
 Randhir Gattla as Cherry
 Poonam Kaur as Anjali
 Suman
 Naresh as Siddhu's father 
 Prudhviraj
 Krishna Bhagavaan
 Suman Setty
 Chanti
 Saikumar Pampana
 Karate Kalyani
 Rachana Maurya (Item Song)

Production
It was announced to Sudheer Babu to do this movie in March 2012. Shooting started on 11 May 2013. Krishna Reddy is debuting as director with this film in Telugu film industry. He earlier worked as co-director for S. S. Rajamouli films. The logo and first look of this film were released on 9 August 2013.

Audio
Sri Kommineni composed the music. The film's audio was launched at Novotel Hyderabad Convention Centre, Hyderabad on 30 October 2013 by Prince Mahesh Babu through Shreyas Music and Krishna launched the theatrical trailer of the film. Vijaya Nirmala, Naresh, Gopichand Malineni, Veeru Potla and Bellamkonda Suresh attended the event. The audio received an enormously positive response from the critics as well as the public.

Release
The film was released worldwide on 7 December 2013.

References

External links

Aadu Magaadra Bujji Movie Review | Rating

2013 films
2010s Telugu-language films
Indian romantic comedy films
Indian romantic action films
Indian action comedy films
2013 masala films
2013 action comedy films
2010s romantic action films
2013 romantic comedy films